Leonard Krieger (28 August 1918 – 12 October 1990) was an American historian who paid particular attention to Modern Europe, especially Germany. He was influential as an intellectual historian, and particularly for his discussion of historicism. He has been called "the most intellectual historian in the United States during the Cold War". He was a member of both the American Academy of Arts and Sciences and the American Philosophical Society.

Krieger was born in Newark, New Jersey. His brother was the literary theorist Murray Krieger. He died of progressive supranuclear palsy (PSP) in 1990.

Works
The German Idea of Freedom (1957)
The Politics of Discretion (1965)
"Culture, Cataclysm, and Contingency," The Journal of Modern History Vol. 40, No. 4, December 1968  
Kings and Philosophers 1689-1789 (1970)  
"The Historical Hannah Arendt," The Journal of Modern History Vol. 48, No. 4, December 1976  
Ranke: The Meaning of History (1977)
Time's Reasons (1989)
Ideas and Events: Professing History (1992)

References

Sources
Carl E. Schorske, "Obituary: Leonard Krieger 1918-1990", Journal of the History of Ideas, Vol. 52, No. 2 (April–June 1991), pp. 340 
Malachi Haim Hacohen, "Review: Leonard Krieger: Historicization and Political Engagement in Intellectual History", History and Theory, Vol. 35, No. 1 (February 1996), pp. 80–130

External links
Obituary, New York Times, 13 October 1990
Memoir by Carl E. Schorske (PDF)

1918 births
1990 deaths
Writers from Newark, New Jersey
20th-century American historians
20th-century American male writers
Historians from New Jersey
American male non-fiction writers
Members of the American Philosophical Society